The 1984–85 Buffalo Sabres season was the 15th season for the National Hockey League franchise that was established on May 22, 1970.

Offseason

Regular season

Final standings

Schedule and results

Playoffs
1985 Stanley Cup playoffs

(A2) Quebec Nordiques vs. (A3) Buffalo Sabres

Quebec won best-of-five series 3–2.

Player statistics

Awards and records

Transactions

Draft picks
Buffalo's draft picks at the 1984 NHL Entry Draft held at the Montreal Forum in Montreal, Quebec. The Sabres attempted to select Eric Weinrich with their ninth round pick, but Weinrich was born later than the cutoff date of September 15, 1966, and was therefore ineligible for the 1984 draft.

Farm teams

See also
1984–85 NHL season

References

Bibliography
 

Buffalo Sabres seasons
Buffalo
Buffalo
Buffalo
Buffalo